Cumberland House Cree Nation 20 is an Indian reserve of the Cumberland House Cree Nation in Saskatchewan.

In the 2016 Canadian Census, it recorded a population of 795 living in 232 of its 235 total private dwellings. In the same year, its Community Well-Being index was calculated at 51 of 100, compared to 58.4 for the average First Nations community and 77.5 for the average non-Indigenous community.

References

Indian reserves in Saskatchewan
Division No. 18, Saskatchewan